Kari Veiteberg (born 4 February 1961) is a Norwegian Lutheran theologian and bishop. Since December 2017 she has been the Bishop of Oslo in the Church of Norway.

Education
Veiteberg is graduated in (Lutheran) theology from the Faculty of Theology at the University of Oslo in 1988, and she took the practical theological exam at the practical theology seminary in Oslo in 1989. In 2006 she became Dr. Theol. at the University of Oslo with the dissertation Kunsten å framføre gudstenester. Dåp i Den norske kyrkja The Art of Performing Church Services. Baptism in the Norwegian Church. She also holds an intermediate degree in theatrical science from the Department of Music and Theater at the University of Oslo.

Bishop
She was a city electoral priest at the Church Mission in Oslo when she was nominated as one of five candidates for the bishopric of Oslo on 19 May 2017. In the first round of voting, in the summer of 2017, she received the greatest support, with 29% of the votes. On September 13, 2017, the Church Council appointed her as the bishop in Oslo. She was consecrated as bishop on December 17, 2017.

References

Bishops of Oslo
21st-century Lutheran bishops
Norwegian Lutherans
1961 births
Living people
Women Lutheran bishops
Norwegian theologians